Neengal Kettavai is a 1984 Indian Tamil-language masala film written and directed by Balu Mahendra. It stars Thiagarajan, Bhanu Chander, Archana and Silk Smitha in major roles, while Jaishankar had an extended cameo as the antagonist. The film was released on 28 June 1984, and was commercially successful.

Plot 

Poornima Bhagyaraj, a widow living in Ooty, leads a peaceful life with her two sons. Jaishankar, a tourist who visits the place rapes her. In the act, Poornima dies leaving her two sons who witness the murder. The eldest son (Bhanu Chander) is raised by his maternal uncle while the younger brother (Thiagarajan) joins a blind music teacher as he has great interest in music. Years later he becomes a great singer. Meanwhile, his brother is trained effectively by his uncle learning martial arts with the intention of avenging the death of his mother as he very well remembers the culprit's face. With a turn of events leading to both sons joining together and take revenge for their mother's death forms the rest of the story.

Cast 
Thiagarajan as Arun
Bhanu Chander as Ramu
Archana as Radha
Smitha as Arun's girlfriend
Poornima Bhagyaraj as Ramu and Arun's mother
Y. G. Mahendran as James
Vanitha
Somayajulu as music teacher
Balan K. Nair as Stunt Master's friend./Uncle of Ramu and Arun
Senthamarai as Stunt Master, Radha's father.
Thengai Srinivasan as Director (Cameo)
Jaishankar as Muthulingam

Production 
Archana made her Tamil cinema debut with the film. The film, unlike Balu Mahendra's previous offbeat ventures, was an "outright commercial picture". He later claimed that he made the film to prove his critics that he could make commercial films. Hence he titled the film Neengal Kettavai (What you asked for). A few scenes were shot at the VGP golden beach. The song "Oh Vasantha Raja" was shot at Brihadisvara Temple, Gangaikonda Cholapuram.

Soundtrack 
The soundtrack was composed by Ilaiyaraaja. The song "Kanavu Kaanum" is based on "Kasme Vaade" from Upkar (1967). For the dubbed Telugu version Kodama Simhalu, the lyrics were written by L. Aathma Rao and Rajasri.

Release and reception 
Neengal Kettavai was released on 28 June 1984. Kalki caustically commented, "Balu Mahendra, idhaiyaa kettom?" (Balu Mahendra, did we ask for ?). Despite the film's box-office success, Mahendra opted to continue making offbeat films.

References

External links 

1980s masala films
1980s Tamil-language films
1984 films
Films directed by Balu Mahendra
Films scored by Ilaiyaraaja
Films shot in Ooty
Indian films about revenge